The 1907 Rutgers Queensmen football team represented Rutgers University as an independent during the 1907 college football season. In their second and last season under head coach Frank Gorton, the Queensmen compiled a 3–5–1 record and were outscored by their opponents, 99 to 76. The team captain, for the second consecutive year, was Douglas J. Fisher.

Schedule

References

Rutgers
Rutgers Scarlet Knights football seasons
Rutgers Queensmen football